Rami Nieminen (born 25 February 1966) is a Finnish former footballer.

He is the most capped player in Finnish top divisions Mestaruussarja and Veikkausliiga. Nieminen played 19 seasons and 459 matches from 1985 to 1989 and 1991 to 2004 for FC Jazz (previously known as PPT), FC Haka and FC Jokerit. After his professional career Nieminen worked several years as a marketing director for FC PoPa.

Honours 
Finnish championship: 1993, 1996

References 

1966 births
Finnish footballers
Finland international footballers
Veikkausliiga players
FC Jazz players
FC Jokerit players
FC Haka players
Living people
Association football defenders
Footballers from Tampere